Eldred is an unincorporated community in Polk County, in the U.S. state of Minnesota.

History
A post office called Eldred was established in 1897, and remained in operation until 1968. According to Warren Upham, the community may be named for Nathaniel B. Eldred, a Pennsylvania judge.

References

Unincorporated communities in Polk County, Minnesota
Unincorporated communities in Minnesota